The Hitler Oath (German:  or Führer Oath)—also referred in English as the Soldier's Oath—refers to the oaths of allegiance sworn by the officers and soldiers of the German Armed Forces and civil servants of Nazi Germany between the years 1934 and 1945. The oath pledged personal loyalty to Adolf Hitler in place of loyalty to the constitution of the country. Historians view the personal oath of the Third Reich as an important psychological element to obey orders for committing war crimes, atrocities, and genocide. During the Nuremberg trials, many German officers unsuccessfully attempted to use the oath as a defense against charges of war crimes and crimes against humanity.

Background
During the Weimar era, the oath of allegiance, sworn by the Reichswehr, required soldiers to swear loyalty to the Reich Constitution and its lawful institutions. Following Hitler's appointment as Chancellor in 1933, the military oath changed, the troops now swearing loyalty to people and country. On the day of the death of German President Paul von Hindenburg, the oath was changed again, as part of the Nazification of the country; it was no longer one of allegiance to the Constitution or its institutions, but one of binding loyalty to the Führer Adolf Hitler himself. 

Although the popular view is that Hitler drafted the oath himself and imposed it on the military, the oath was the initiative of Defence Minister General Werner von Blomberg and General Walther von Reichenau, the chief of the Ministerial Office. The intention of Blomberg and Reichenau in having the military swear an oath to Hitler was to create a personal special bond between him and the military, which was intended to tie Hitler more tightly towards the military and away from the NSDAP. Years later, Blomberg admitted that he did not think through the full implications of the oath at the time.

On 20 August 1934, the cabinet decreed the "Law On The Allegiance of Civil Servants and Soldiers of the Armed Forces", which superseded the original oaths. The new law decreed that both members of the armed forces and civil servants had to swear an oath of loyalty to Hitler personally.

Previous oaths

Reichswehr oath 
From 1919 until 1935, the Weimar Republic's armed forces were called the Reichswehr ("Realm Defence").

The Original Oath called the  came into effect on 14 August 1919, shortly after Reichspräsident Friedrich Ebert had signed the Weimar Constitution for the German Reich (the so-called Weimar Republic). The Treaty of Versailles limited the Reichswehr to a total of 100,000 men.

From 1919 to December 1933:

"I swear loyalty to the Reich's constitution and pledge,that I as a courageous soldier always want to protect the German Reich and its legal institutions,(and) be obedient to the Reich President and to my superiors."

In January 1933, when Adolf Hitler was appointed Reichskanzler and the Enabling Act and Gleichschaltung came into effect, the military oath changed again.

From 2 December 1933 to 2 August 1934:

"I swear by God this holy oath,that I want to ever loyally and sincerely serve my people and fatherlandand be prepared as a brave and obedient soldierto risk my life for this oath at any time."

After the death of German President Paul von Hindenburg on 2 August 1934, Hitler merged the offices of Reichspräsident and Reichskanzler, and declared himself Führer and Reichskanzler. From that point on, all military personnel swore an oath of allegiance and binding loyalty to Adolf Hitler himself.

Führer oath

Wehrmacht oath 

Wehrmacht Oath of Loyalty to Adolf Hitler

"I swear to God this holy oath that I shall render unconditional obedienceto the Leader of the German Reich and people, Adolf Hitler, supreme commander of the armed forces,and that as a brave soldier I shall at all times be preparedto give my life for this oath."

When the oath became law in July 1935, civilian officials would swear a similar oath.

Civil servant oath

Public servants Oath to Adolf Hitler

"I swear: I will be faithful and obedientto the leader of the German Reich and people, Adolf Hitler,to observe the law, and to conscientiously fulfil my official duties, so help me God!"

Oathtakers then sang both Deutschland Über Alles and the Nazi anthem Horst-Wessel-Lied.

Public figures who refused to take the oath
Thousands of military officers reportedly claimed to be ill to avoid taking the oath but were forced to do so after returning to duty.

 Karl Barth (Swiss theologian); Consequences: loss of professorship
 Martin Gauger (probationary judge as a state prosecutor in Wuppertal); Consequences: forced retirement of his position as a state prosecutor
 Franz Jägerstätter (Austrian conscientious objector); Consequences: execution in 1943; beatified in 2007
 Josef Mayr-Nusser (from Bozen), after call-up for duty in the Waffen-SS; Consequences: Death penalty, died on the way to the Dachau concentration camp
 Joseph Ruf ("Brother Maurus" of the Christkönigsgesellschaft) Consequences: Death penalty
 Franz Reinisch (Pallottines padre from Austria), after call-up for duty in the German Wehrmacht; Consequences: execution by beheading in 1942

See also
Ceremonial oath of the Bundeswehr

References

Citations

Sources

Further reading

  Gesetz über die Vereidigung der Beamten und der Soldaten der Wehrmacht
  Wehrpflicht
  :de:Gelöbnis#Deutsche Soldateneide
  Gustav Heinemann: Eid und Entscheidung

Symbols of Nazi Germany
Wehrmacht
Oaths of allegiance
Oath
Military oaths
1934 documents
1934 in Germany